The Night Hawk is a 1924 American silent Western film directed by Stuart Paton and featuring Harry Carey.

Plot
As described in a film magazine review, Panther Gann, wanted by the city police, escapes with the aid of José Valdez. He goes West with José. Gann agrees to kill Sheriff Hilton, José's enemy, and catches and tames a wild horse which he names El Sang'rito. Gann falls in love with Clia, Hilton's daughter, and spares her father. After many adventures, he rescues Clia from abductors with the help of his horse, and successfully defends her father from a gang of gunmen. Gann wins the affections of Clia and she agrees to become his wife.

Cast

Preservation
With no prints of The Night Hawk located in any film archives, it is a lost film.

See also
 Harry Carey filmography

References

External links
 

1924 films
1924 lost films
1924 Western (genre) films
American black-and-white films
Films directed by Stuart Paton
Films distributed by W. W. Hodkinson Corporation
Films with screenplays by Joseph F. Poland
Lost Western (genre) films
Lost American films
Silent American Western (genre) films
1920s American films